Woolwine is an unincorporated community in northern Patrick County, Virginia, United States. The western terminus of State Route 40 is here, at State Route 8. The community lies in the Rocky Knob American Viticultural Area. Two covered bridges are located in Woolwine: the Jack's Creek Covered Bridge (built 1914) and the more recent Clifford Wood Covered Bridge (built 1977) which is privately owned. They span the Smith River. The Bob White Covered Bridge (built 1921), which also spanned the Smith River, was destroyed during flooding on September 29, 2015.
 
The community sits at the foot of the Blue Ridge Mountains.

Baseball player Herb Hash was born in Woolwine.

Climate
The climate in this area is characterized by hot, humid summers and generally mild to cool winters. According to the Köppen Climate Classification system, Woolwine has a humid subtropical climate, abbreviated "Cfa" on climate maps.

References

External links
 Dale J. Travis Covered Bridges. VA Covered Bridges: Credits. Retrieved Nov. 12, 2007

Unincorporated communities in Virginia
Unincorporated communities in Patrick County, Virginia